Niethammer is a German surname. Notable people with the surname include:

 Barbara Niethammer (born 1967), German mathematician
 Friedrich Immanuel Niethammer (1766–1848), German theologian
 Günther Niethammer (1908–1974), German ornithologist

German-language surnames